Dilta hibernica is a species of jumping bristletail in the family Machilidae. It is found in Europe.

References

Further reading

 
 
 

Archaeognatha
Articles created by Qbugbot
Insects described in 1907